"Medicine" is a song by British singer-songwriter James Arthur. It was released as a digital download and for streaming on 5 March 2021. The song was written by George Tizzard, James Bell, James Arthur and Rick Parkhouse.

Background
On 26 February 2021, Arthur announced the release date for the single on his Twitter account. In a press release, he said, "'Medicine' is an uplifting ode to self, to relationships, to community and connection, and to the healing, restorative powers of love over adversity. It is, you might say, the perfect song for spring 2021. The last year has forced many couple to look at themselves. It held a mirror up to us all, didn't it? And my partner was hugely supportive through that whole time. There are some pretty dark lyrics in there: 'When I’m suicidal, you don't let me spiral…'". In an interview with the Official Charts Company, he said, "When I wrote it six months ago there was no vaccine or any end in sight to this. I definitely felt at the time that I'd like to get this song out as soon as possible, knowing that it would probably be another six months before the world would hear it. It's almost even more fitting now that there's a light at the end of the tunnel."

Music video
A music video to accompany the release of "Medicine" was first released onto YouTube on 5 March 2021.

Personnel
Credits adapted from Tidal.

 Matt Rad – producer
 Red Triangle – producer
 George Tizzard – composer, lyricist
 James Bell – composer, lyricist
 James Arthur – composer, lyricist, associated performer
 Rick Parkhouse – composer, lyricist

 Jermie Inhaber – assistant engineer
 Robin Florent – assistant engineer
 Scott Desmarais – assistant engineer
 Randy Merrill – mastering engineer
 Chris Galland – mixing engineer
 Manny Marroquin – mixing engineer

Charts

Certifications

Release history

References

2021 singles
2021 songs
James Arthur songs
Songs written by James Arthur
Songs written by Rick Parkhouse
Songs written by George Tizzard
Song recordings produced by Red Triangle (production team)
Song recordings produced by Matt Rad
Columbia Records singles